The Dwarka Sector 11 Metro Station is located on the Blue Line of the Delhi Metro.

The station

Station layout

Facilities
List of available ATM at Dwarka Sector 11 metro station are Punjab National Bank, Canara Bank.

Entry/Exit

Connections

Bus
Delhi Transport Corporation bus routes number 728, 770B, 833STL, RL-77A, RL-77EXT serves the station from Rajkiya Pratibha Vikas Vidyalay stop nearby.

See also

Delhi
List of Delhi Metro stations
Transport in Delhi
Delhi Metro Rail Corporation
Delhi Suburban Railway
Delhi Monorail
Delhi Transport Corporation
West Delhi
New Delhi
Dwarka, Delhi
National Capital Region (India)
List of rapid transit systems
List of metro systems

References

External links

 Delhi Metro Rail Corporation Ltd. (Official site) 
 Delhi Metro Annual Reports
 
 UrbanRail.Net – descriptions of all metro systems in the world, each with a schematic map showing all stations.

Delhi Metro stations
Railway stations opened in 2006
2006 establishments in Delhi
Railway stations in South West Delhi district